João, Prince of Brazil (August 30 – September 17, 1688 in Lisbon) was the first child of Peter II of Portugal and Maria Sophia of Neuburg. He was made Prince of Brazil and Duke of Braganza upon his birth.

Ancestry

References

1688 births
1688 deaths
Princes of Brazil
House of Braganza
Dukes of Braganza
17th-century Portuguese people
Heirs apparent who never acceded
Burials at the Monastery of São Vicente de Fora
Sons of kings
Royalty and nobility who died as children